F. Michael Kruse (born 1948) is the Chief Justice of the High Court of American Samoa.

Personal
Kruse was born in Samoa. He received his secondary education in Auckland, New Zealand at St Peter's College. He graduated LL.B at Victoria University of Wellington in 1972. He is married to Gail. His eldest son, Vincent, is a lawyer practicing in Hawaii.

Career
Kruse returned to American Samoa and practised law. He was appointed as an Associate Justice of the High Court of American Samoa in 1987 and as Chief Justice of American Samoa in 1988. The Chief Justice is the head of the High Court of American Samoa.

References

1948 births
American Samoan lawyers
Chief Justices of the High Court of American Samoa
Justices of the High Court of American Samoa
Living people
People educated at St Peter's College, Auckland
Victoria University of Wellington alumni